Johann Bernhard Merian or Jean-Bernard Mérian (28 September 1723, Liestal – 12 February 1807, Berlin) was a Swiss philosopher active in the Prussian Academy of Sciences in Berlin.

Merian studied at the University of Basle, gaining his doctorate in 1740. He became a member of the Class for Speculative Philosophy of the Berlin Academy in 1750, and director of the Class for Belles-Lettres in 1771. From 1797 he was permanent Secretary of the Academy.

Merian translated the work of David Hume into French. He published widely in the Mémoires of the Academy. A series of essays on the Molyneux problem appeared in the 1770s.

References

External links

1723 births
1807 deaths
Swiss philosophers
Swiss Protestants
English–French translators
People from Liestal
Johann Bernhard
18th-century translators